Benjamin Keleketu (born 6 February 1965) is a Botswana long-distance runner. He competed in the men's marathon at the 1992 Summer Olympics and the 1996 Summer Olympics.

References

External links
 

1965 births
Living people
Athletes (track and field) at the 1992 Summer Olympics
Athletes (track and field) at the 1996 Summer Olympics
Botswana male long-distance runners
Botswana male marathon runners
Olympic athletes of Botswana
Place of birth missing (living people)
Olympic male marathon runners